Leopold Gleim was a Colonel and SS Standartenführer in Warsaw during the Second World War.  

He was for a time head of the Gestapo Department for Jewish Affairs in Poland.  After the war, he converted to Islam, taking the name of Ali al-Nahar, and served with the Egyptian state services.

External links
Namebase - 4 citations (Archive)

References
The Holocaust conspiracy: an international policy of genocide by William R. Perl

SS-Standartenführer
German Muslims